Angelin Velea (born 1 April 1963) is a Romanian sprint canoeist who competed in the mid to late 1980s. He won three medals at the ICF Canoe Sprint World Championships with two golds (K-2 1000 m: 1986, K-4 1000 m: 1983) and a bronze (K-2 10000 m: 1986).

Velea also competed in two Summer Olympics, earning his best finish of fourth  in the K-4 1000 m at Los Angeles in 1984.

References

1963 births
Canoeists at the 1984 Summer Olympics
Canoeists at the 1988 Summer Olympics
Living people
Olympic canoeists of Romania
Romanian male canoeists
ICF Canoe Sprint World Championships medalists in kayak